The Mosque of Amir Altinbugha al-Maridani, dating from 1340 CE, is a mosque from the era of the Mamluk Sultanate of Cairo, Egypt. Located south of Bab Zuweila, in the Darb al-Ahmar neighbourhood, it was built on the outskirts of medieval Cairo by Amir Altinbugha al-Maridani, with significant help from Sultan al-Nasir Muhammad. The mosque has a hypostyle plan similar to the Mosque of al-Nasir, and its exterior walls are decorated in typical Mamluk architecture style. At the time of its building, it was one of the most extravagantly decorated mosques in Cairo, marked by the first fully octagonal minaret and large dome, as well as other architectural innovations. Its history and luxuriousness are directly correlated to the life and prominence of al-Maridani, as it was built with the patronage of his father-in-law, Sultan Muhammad and significant donations from al-Maridani's own pocket.

Historical background

Construction process 
The land for the Mosque was in Tabbana quarter of Cairo, and was originally a burial area; in the Islamic year 738 (1337–38 CE) al-Maridani purchased the area on which the sultan and he would commission the mosque. Sultan Muhammad appointed an overseer to purchase the surrounding houses, which he subsequently cleared. To build the mosque, the sultan appointed his master builder, al-mu'allim (the teacher) al-Suyufi, and provided about 15,000 dirhams worth of wood and marble. Construction began in 739/1338–39, and total expenditure for the mosque reached over three hundred thousand dirhams. Al-Maridani contributed a substantial amount to the mosque's construction, as he was seriously ill throughout it and hoped to make it as memorable as possible.

Life of Amir Altinbugha al-Maridani 
Al-Maridani first rose to prominence as the cupbearer of Sultan Muhammad, but the date of this appointment is unknown. The sultan must have favored al-Maridani, as the sultan eventually married his daughter to al-Maridani, making the sultan al-Maridani's father-in-law. In addition to this marriage, the Sultan appointed al-Maridani as the chief of Cairo's police force thereby making him the "amir of a thousand". When al-Nasir Muhammad died, al-Maridani "slandered the new sultan al-Mansur Abu Bakr's authority" to another amir, and thus tricked the amir to depose the new sultan. Al-Maridani continued to have success in "power politics, crossing and double crossing" local players under al-Ashraf Kujuk and al-Salih Isma'il. Ultimately, however, he died in exile as the governor of Aleppo in 744/1343.

Description

Floor plan and foundation 

The Mosque of Amir al-Maridani is built with both hypostyle and riwaq plans, similar to the sultan's mosque in the Citadel, with a dome above the mihrab and three axial entrances. The mosque is not rectangular, however, because of the constraints of urban construction. Specifically, the northeastern corner was built so that it would not encroach upon Tabanna Street nor a neighboring small lane. It is not, however, as irregular as some mosques in urban Cairo, such as Ulmas' Mosque. Notably, the only reference for the start of construction comes from the foundation: a band of inscription at the mosque's west entrance suggests that the mosque went under construction in 739/1338–9.

Exterior 
The exterior Amir al-Maridani's mosque is typical for an urban Mamluk mosque, characterized by "recesses crowned with stalactites including double-arched windows".  The mosque has three entrances, with the west entrance on the same axis as that of the prayer niche and the main entrance on the north side of the mosque; each has the shape of an iwan with a pointed arch and is topped by a medallion of faience mosaics. The main entrance is a deep recess, crowned by a muqarnas cresting, panelled with marble and richly patterned. The joggled door lintels and the small window framed by colonettes are both common features in Mamluk architecture. In this case, the small outer window corresponds to an inner window with a blue-and-white tile grille. The date of completion appears on the main entrance's crown, and again on the west entrance and in the sanctuary. The west entrance is decorated differently, with a sunrise motif decorating muqarnas pendentives in the ablaq technique of alternating light and dark stone courses. Between the pendentives, a medallion with a smaller medallion in its center is decorated with tile mosaics. The south entrance is entirely undecorated.

The facade of the main wall, which corresponds to the interior mihrab wall, is panelled with recessed windows.  The lower windows are rectangular while the upper are double arched with single arched qamariyyas, multicolored stained glass windows, mirroring them on the interior. The northern, eastern and part of the southern facades are the only ones with these windows, as they would have lined the busiest streets and as such been the most visible walls. The remaining wall sections, around the west and south entrances, are plain and windowless. The main wall is buttressed by the mihrab, as it protrudes slightly into an otherwise thin outer wall.

The Minaret 
Located just to the left of the main entrance, the minaret is the earliest known example of entirely octagonal shaft and pavilion,. It is also the earliest minaret crowned with a top that is not the mabkhara type. Instead, the pear-shaped bulb sits on top of the eight-columned pavilion crowned with muqarnas; it is replicated on the interior wooden pulpit. On the wall beneath the minaret, the golden band that runs from the main entrance along the entire facade breaks, and the corner nearest the mosque is missing its colonettes. The buttress of the minaret is also built with different stone that the rest of the mosque, indicating that this section of the wall was rebuilt.

Interior 
As is the case with many Mamluk era hypostyle mosques, the Mosque of Amir al-Maridani is supported by columns from earlier buildings. In this case, the granite columns were taken from the Fatimid mosque of Rashida, though they were originally taken from ancient monuments. Many of the columns have varying heights which is compensated for with different sized pedestals. The eight columns that support the dome, however, are all of equal size, have ancient Egyptian capitals, and were likely brought from Upper Egypt.

Courtyard 
The facade of the courtyard, created by the surrounding arcades, is characterized by features that are unusual for Mamluk architecture.  The points of the arches are framed with a continuous molding that curls into a loop at the top of each arch, and stucco carved niches and medallions alternate in the spandrels of each arcade. Crenellation crowns the arches, and is also carved in stucco. Relieving oculi penetrate the spandrels of the second row of arches, and at each corner and the middle of each wall of the courtyard a small domicile with a mabkhara contains a bright blue bulb of glass.

The fountain in the courtyard is not a part of the original mosque.

The courtyard area is separated from the sanctuary with a mashrabiyya, upon which is a large inscription from the Qur'an. This wooden screen mostly shades the sanctuary from the courtyard's light, making the double windows in the outer wall necessary.

Sanctuary 
The sanctuary, while richly decorated at one point is "currently in bad shape". The qibla wall is decorated with the remains of gilded stucco and epigraphic bands, with trees at their center. These trees are one of the only extant naturalistic features in Mamluk architectural decoration. The mihrab is made of polychrome marble and has friezes of small niches with blue-glass colonettes on the side framing its upper edge. The dado has similar friezes. The walls are decorated with marble mosaics centered by a Kufic inscription of Allah, and on the northern wall there is a panel made totally of white marble inlaid with green gypsum. The function of the small room in the southeast corner is unknown.
The pulpit is original and decorated with a geometric star pattern.

Dome 
The dome, over the mihrab area, is slightly smaller than the dome of the Al-Nasir Muhammad Mosque, and has similar gilded and painted wooden pendentives. The windows in the transitional zone between ceiling and dome are of one oculus over two bays, and are decorated with stucco arabesque grills filled with colored glass.

Sources of information 
Other than current observation of its architecture, one of the only sources of information about the Mosque of Amir al-Maridani is the Cairene historian al-Maqrizi. In his two volume work Mawaiz wa al-'i'tibar bi dhikr al-khitat wa al-'athar (al-Khitat), Maqrizi describes the physical layout of medieval Cairo in exact detail, including buildings' construction histories and their connections to greater Cairene society. 650 years after it was written, al-Khitat remains the most useful source of information on buildings and their significance in medieval Cairo.

Unfortunately, he does not provide much background for the Mosque of Amir al-Maridani: he only shares how the site was acquired, some brief summarizing details about the mosque's construction, and Amir al-Maridani's later life history. One possible reason is that al-Maridani's mosque was relatively young when Maqrizi composed al-Khitat, completed less than one hundred years previously. However, whatever the reason, the lack of description from Maqrizi means that much of the history of the Mosque of al-Maridani is unrecorded and thus unknowable.

Damage and restoration work 
The mosque was restored by the Comité de Conservation des Monuments de l'Art Arabe in 1895–1903. Since then, however, it has suffered from neglect and progressive deterioration. Along with the usual accumulation of dust and grime from the desert environment of Cairo and urban pollution, the mosque has also suffered from humidity and water damage due to the rising water table and leaking sewage from the surrounding neighborhood. The sanctuary (or prayer hall) is in particularly bad condition. Cracks have appeared in the walls and the marble panel decoration was made particularly vulnerable. Between 2007 and 2010, the wooden insets that make up the ornament of the minbar were looted.

A major restoration and rehabilitation project, begun in 2018 and scheduled to last until 2020, has been undertaken by the Egyptian Government in collaboration with the Aga Khan Cultural Services-Egypt (part of the Aga Khan Development Network). It will focus on restoring the prayer hall and aims to also integrate the mosque into a tourist route along the Darb al-Ahmar district.

Architectural commonalities 
 A similar riwaq plan is found in the mosques of Amir Husayn, Bashtak, Ulmas, Sitt Miska/Hadaq, Aqsunqur, Qawsun, and Arghun Shah al-Isma'ili.
 The top of the minaret is similar to the top of the minaret at the Mosque of Bashtak.
 A wooden dome over a mihrab is also found at the mosques of al-Zahir Baybars and al-Nasir Muhammad. Smaller wooden domes are above the mihrab area at the mosques of Zayn al-Din Yahya in Bulaq and Habbaniyya.
 The Mosque of Sitt Hadaq also has recessed panels with windows appearing on only three of the four facades.
 A pattern of three axial entrance is also found at the mosques of al-Zahir Baybars and al-Nasir Muhammad.
 Decorative tile usage is also found at the Mosque of al-Nasir Muhammad.
 Marble dados were also found in the sanctuaries of the mosques of al-Nasir Muhammad and al-Mu'ayyad.
 A similar mashrabiyya is found at Qalawun's mausoleum.

See also 
  Lists of mosques 
  List of mosques in Africa
  List of mosques in Egypt

References

Further reading

External links 

 Amir Altinbugha al-Maridani Mosque
 Mosque of Amir al-Maridani

14th-century mosques
Buildings and structures completed in 1340
Amir al-Maridani
Amir al-Maridani
Mamluk architecture in Egypt